Kentucky Route 53 (KY 53) is a  state highway in the U.S. state of Kentucky.

Route description
The route begins at an intersection with KY 555 south of Willisburg and heads northeast through the city. It continues northeast into Anderson County and intersects the Martha Layne Collins Blue Grass Parkway. Just south of Beaver Lake KY 53 turns toward the northwest and forms a concurrency with US 62. Further north in Glensboro, it forms a concurrency with KY 44 and continues northwest, briefly passing through Spencer County before entering Shelby County. In Shelby County, the route passes through Mount Eden and heads northwest into Shelbyville. In Shelbyville, KY 53 intersects Interstate 64 as well as US 60. North of Shelbyville, the route enters Oldham County and passes through Ballardsville and LaGrange, where it intersects with Interstate 71. KY 53 ends at an intersection with US 42 north of LaGrange.

Major intersections

References

0053
0053
0053
0053
0053
0053